Hans Wipf (born 1898, date of death unknown) was a Swiss athlete. He competed in the men's javelin throw at the 1924 Summer Olympics.

References

External links
 

1898 births
Year of death missing
Athletes (track and field) at the 1924 Summer Olympics
Swiss male javelin throwers
Olympic athletes of Switzerland
Place of birth missing